KIPA (1060 AM) is a radio station on the Big Island of Hawai'i whose call sign dates back to 1947, and broadcasts a Christian format as an owned an operated affiliate of CSN International. Licensed to Hilo, Hawaii, United States, the station serves the Hilo market and surrounding areas.

History
The 1060 AM frequency went on the air as KAHU on 1984-12-27. On 19 March 2003, the station changed its call sign to Hilo's original call letters est. 1936, KHBC. In June 2009, the station changed its call sign to relaunch the heritage station, KIPA (call letters established 1947 at 620 AM), and reassigned "KHBC" to its FM sister station on 92.7 FM in Hilo (formerly KHWI). The calls "KHWI" were later moved to its new sister station in Kailua-Kona at 92.1 FM. In 2020, KIPA was sold to Calvary Chapel of Twin Falls, along with the construction permit for translator 99.3 K257GV, for $80,000.

References

External links

Radio stations established in 1984
1984 establishments in Hawaii
IPA (AM)